This is a list of the Sites of Special Scientific Interest (SSSIs) in Shropshire. For other counties, see List of SSSIs by Area of Search

References

 
Shropshire
Shropshire